Rowan Hendricks (born 15 November 1979) is a South African former professional footballer who played as a midfielder.

Club career
On 20 February 2003, FC Rostov announced the signing of Hendricks and fellow South African Japhet Zwane.

In January 2005, Hendricks went on trial with Allsvenskan club Djurgårdens during their training camp in South Africa.

In January 2009, Hendricks signed for Ikapa Sporting.

International career
Hendricks earned his first call up to the South Africa team in April 2004, being one of two uncapped players, along with Mark Arber, in Stuart Baxter's 21-man squad.

Coaching career
After retiring from professional football, Hendricks became a coach at Ajax Cape Town.
He is the current assistant coach of Venda Football Academy in the National First Division 2021-

Career statistics

Club

International

References

External links 
 

1979 births
Living people
South African soccer players
South Africa international soccer players
South African expatriate soccer players
Russian Premier League players
Bundesliga players
Cape Town Spurs F.C. players
Eintracht Frankfurt players
Eintracht Frankfurt II players
FC Rostov players
SuperSport United F.C. players
Ikapa Sporting F.C. players
F.C. AK players
Expatriate footballers in Germany
Expatriate footballers in Russia
Association football midfielders